AFDB may refer to:
Adult Film Database
African Development Bank
Aluminum Foil Deflector Beanie (Tin foil hat)
 Large Auxiliary Floating Dry Docks, Big